Atractocarpus heterophyllus is a species of flowering plant in the family Rubiaceae.  The plant is native to southeastern New Caledonia.

References

heterophyllus
Flora of New Caledonia
Plants described in 1860